The 1999 Florida Gators football team represented the University of Florida during 1999 NCAA Division I-A football season. The season was Steve Spurrier's tenth as the head coach of the Florida Gators football team.  The Gators returned to the SEC Championship Game after a two-year hiatus, but did not bring home another SEC Championship trophy.  After losing the SEC Championship Game 34–7 to the Alabama Crimson Tide, the Gators ended their season with a last-second 37–34 loss to the Michigan State Spartans in the Citrus Bowl.  Spurrier's 1999 Florida Gators posted a 9–4 overall record and a 7–1 record in the Southeastern Conference, placing first among the six SEC Eastern Division teams.

Schedule

Game summaries

Georgia

Rankings

Roster

References

Florida
Florida Gators football seasons
Florida Gators football